The 2015 Newfoundland and Labrador Tankard, the provincial men's curling championship of Newfoundland and Labrador, was held from February 6 to 8 at the Carol Curling Club in Labrador City. The winning Brad Gushue rink represented Newfoundland and Labrador at the 2015 Tim Hortons Brier in Calgary.

Teams
Due to the cost of flying from Newfoundland to Labrador and the skill level of the perennial provincial champion Brad Gushue rink, only two teams entered the competition: Gushue and a local Labrador City team, the Gary Wensman rink.

Results
Gushue and Wensman played a best of five series.

Draw 1
Friday, February 6, 2:30 pm

Draw 2
Friday, February 6, 7:30 pm

Draw 3
Saturday, February 7, 9:30 am

References

Newfoundland and Labrador Tankard
Curling in Newfoundland and Labrador
Labrador
Newfoundland and Labrador Tankard
Tankard